Paul-André Massé (5 November 1947 – 17 March 2019) was a Liberal party member of the House of Commons of Canada. He was a public servant by career.

Born in Saint-Jean-sur-Richelieu, Quebec, Massé represented Quebec's Saint-Jean electoral district, winning the seat in the 1979 federal election.  Massé was re-elected in the 1980 election, but lost in 1984 to André Bissonnette of the Progressive Conservative party. Massé served in the 31st and 32nd Canadian Parliaments.

External links
 

1947 births
2019 deaths
French Quebecers
Liberal Party of Canada MPs
Members of the House of Commons of Canada from Quebec
People from Saint-Jean-sur-Richelieu